Dolserau Halt (Pron: Dol-seh-rye) in Gwynedd, Wales, was on the Ruabon to Barmouth line. The platform edge was made of timber and was situated on the north side of the line. It had a timber shelter and a name-board with the suffix "FOR THE TORRENT WALK" (a popular trail through Afon Clywedog gorge on the other side of the valley). There was no passing place or freight activity here.

The halt has been demolished.

Neighbouring stations

References

Further reading

External links
 Dolserau Halt on navigable 1946 O.S. map

Disused railway stations in Gwynedd
Railway stations in Great Britain opened in 1935
Railway stations in Great Britain closed in 1951
Brithdir and Llanfachreth
Former Great Western Railway stations